Herbert Marx may refer to:

 Herbert Manfred Marx, known as Zeppo Marx, member of The Marx Brothers
 Herbert Marx (politician) (1932—2020), Canadian politician and judge